The women's aerials event in freestyle skiing at the 2010 Winter Olympics in Vancouver, Canada took place on the February 20 (Qualification) and February 24 (Final) at Cypress Bowl Ski Area.

Results

Qualification
The qualification was held on 20 February at 10:00.

Final
The final was held on 24 February at 19:30.

References

Women's freestyle skiing at the 2010 Winter Olympics
Women's events at the 2010 Winter Olympics